Pataura may refer to:

Pataura, Nepal
Pataura, Jaunpur, a village in Uttar Pradesh, India